Pogorelovka is a rural locality (a khutor) in Sergeyevskoye Rural Settlement, Podgorensky District, Voronezh Oblast, Russia. The population was 62 as of 2010. There are 2 streets.

Geography 
Pogorelovka is located 17 km east of Podgorensky (the district's administrative centre) by road. Sergeyevka is the nearest rural locality.

References 

Rural localities in Podgorensky District